Weem (Scottish Gaelic: Baile a' Chlachain) is a village on the B846 near Aberfeldy in Perthshire, Scotland.
The name Weem is derived from the Gaelic uamh, meaning 'cave'.

Nearby is Castle Menzies. One of Scotland's best-preserved 16th-century castles, Castle Menzies is the seat of Clan Menzies.  Looked after by a private preservation trust, the Castle and grounds are open to visitors in summer (entrance charge).

The Old Parish Church of Weem, of medieval origin, contains the funerary monuments of the Menzies family from the 16th century, and the heraldic hatchments carried at their funerals.  Key from neighbouring cottage.

There are two pubs in Weem, the Ailean Chraggan and the Weem Inn.

References

External links

 Clan Menzies :: Castle :: Intro

Villages in Perth and Kinross